The qualification for the 2016 European Baseball Championship started on July 29, 2014 in Ljubljana, Slovenia.

C-level qualifier

Group A

Group B

Final stage
Semifinals

Final

Final standings

B-level qualifier
Top team from each group will qualify for the 2016 European Baseball Championship, bottom team from each group will be relegated to C-Pool.

Vienna group

Final

Karlovac group 

The game Slovakia – Switzerland was cancelled.

Final

References

External links
2014 Pool C Ljubljana Site
2015 Pool B Vienna Site
2015 Pool B Karlovac Site

Qualifier European Baseball Championship
Qualifier European Baseball Championship
European Baseball Championship – Qualification
2014 in Croatian sport
Baseball in Croatia
International sports competitions hosted by Croatia
Qualification